André Martin (15 July 1908 – 2 July 1991) was a French sport shooter. He competed in two events at the 1952 Summer Olympics.

References

1908 births
1991 deaths
French male sport shooters
Olympic shooters of France
Shooters at the 1952 Summer Olympics
20th-century French people